Metody Patchev (May 7, 1875 – April 7, 1902) was a Bulgarian teacher and revolutionary, vojvoda of the Internal Macedonian-Adrianople Revolutionary Organization. According to the post-WWII Macedonian historiography, he was an ethnic Macedonian.

Life
Patchev was born in Ohrid, Ottoman Empire in 1875. As young man he moved to Plovdiv in Bulgaria to apply for work in a leather production company. When he arrived back to Ohrid, he became a Bulgarian Exarchate teacher in 1896. Metody also known as Metodija applied himself in a secret society known then as Bulgarian Macedonian-Adrianople Revolutionary Committees (BMARC)  On August 5, 1898, Dimitar Grdanov, a Serbian teacher in Ohrid, and pro-Serbian activist in Macedonia, was murdered by Metody Patchev, after which Patchev and his fellow conspirators Hristo Uzunov, Cyril Parlichev and Ivan Grupchev were arrested.  He stayed in Ottoman prison until 1901. After his release he applied as a teacher in the town of Prilep, but was unsuccessful due to his times in prison previously. Later in rejoining the Internal Macedonian-Adrianople Revolutionary Organization he became involved in a cheta group under the command of Marko Lerinski. On 7 April 1902 he entered the village of Kadino Selo with six other revolutionaries unaware of the situation in Kadino Selo he went into an ambush. The Ottoman troops within the village, were under attack from a small group of revolutionaries. After fierce fighting in the village and surrounds, Metodija killed his friends and committed suicide.

After his death his unoccupied house was used as a secret hospital. Local female teachers including Kostadina Bojadjeva helped wounded fighters at the building. The Ottomans discovered the hospital but could find no charges against the teachers. They were held, interrogated, beaten and released. The hospital continued to operate and the local mayor arranged for free milk to assist them.

In 1904 in Philadelphia, Pennsylvania, a group of Bulgarian immigrants established the Macedonian-Adrianople Charitable Society "Metody Patchev". To the heroic death of Patchev and his comrades, Hristo Silyanov dedicated his poem "Kadino Village Heroes", published in 1904 in Bulgarian.

References

1875 births
1902 deaths
People from Ohrid
Members of the Internal Macedonian Revolutionary Organization
19th-century Bulgarian people
Bulgarian revolutionaries
Bulgarian educators
Macedonian Bulgarians
Bulgarian assassins
Bulgarian people imprisoned abroad
Prisoners and detainees of the Ottoman Empire
1902 murders in the Ottoman Empire